is a Japanese sport shooter.

Matsuda represented Japan at the 2008 Summer Olympics, where he got 8th place in the 50 m pistol event and 18th place in the 10 m air pistol event. He also competed at the 2012 Summer Olympics, finishing in 11th place in the 50 m pistol event and 13th place in the 10 m air pistol event. 

Matsuda started his international career in 2002. 

He won the gold medal in the 10 m air pistol event at the World Championships held in Munich in 2010.

References 

1975 births
Living people
Japanese male sport shooters
Olympic shooters of Japan
Shooters at the 2008 Summer Olympics
Shooters at the 2012 Summer Olympics
Shooters at the 2016 Summer Olympics
Asian Games medalists in shooting
Shooters at the 2010 Asian Games
Shooters at the 2014 Asian Games
Shooters at the 2018 Asian Games
Asian Games silver medalists for Japan
Asian Games bronze medalists for Japan
Medalists at the 2010 Asian Games
Medalists at the 2018 Asian Games
21st-century Japanese people